The EOS IX (world markets) or EOS IX E (Japanese market) is an APS-format single-lens reflex camera that was introduced by Canon Inc. of Japan in October 1996 as part of their EOS series SLR cameras.   The other APS camera in this series is the Canon EOS IX Lite, also known as the EOS IX 7. Production ended in 2001.

Autofocus and viewfinder

The EOS IX features Canon's Multi-BASIS TTL phase detection autofocus system with three focusing points.  The Japanese EOS IX E model added Canon's Eye Control focus point selection system; in both, the three focus points can also be selected between manually, or automatically by the camera.  The selected focus point lights in the viewfinder.  Other superimposed viewfinder features include masks for the three APS formats (C, H and P), while an LCD outside the image area displays other shooting information.  The viewfinder incorporates a roof pentamirror of 0.6× magnification (with a 40 mm lens focussed on infinity) and 95% coverage.

Shutter, metering and exposure

The shutter, a vertically traveling, electronically controlled metal blade unit, can be set for speeds between 30 and 1/4000 seconds, with an X-sync speed of 1/200 second.  A "Bulb" mode is also available, for exposure as long as the shutter button is depressed.  The speed is continuously variable in Program and aperture-priority modes, and can be set in half-stop increments in shutter-priority and manual modes.

Metering is via a silicon photocell (SPC) giving 6-zone evaluative metering, center-weighted metering, and 6.5% partial metering.  The metering range, at ISO 100 with a 1.4 lens, is EV 1–20. Exposure compensation of ±2 EV can be applied in half-stop increments; the same range and increments apply to 3-shot auto-bracketing.  The film speed range supported is ISO 25 to 8000, using DX coding if available.

Flash

The EOS IX supports Canon's new E-TTL flash metering system when using modern Speedlite EX flashes, as well as the older A-TTL system, which is used with the on-board popup flash and older external flashes (Speedlite EZ).

References

External links 

 Review by Philip Greenspun
 Introduction to Canon EOS cameras by Toomas Tamm

IX
Products introduced in 1996